The Adventures of Philip Marlowe was a radio series featuring Raymond Chandler's private eye, Philip Marlowe. Robert C. Reinehr and Jon D. Swartz, in their book, The A to Z of Old Time Radio, noted that the program differed from most others in its genre: "It was a more hard-boiled program than many of the other private detective shows of the time, containing few quips or quaint characters."

The program first aired 17 June 1947 on NBC radio under the title The New Adventures of Philip Marlowe, with Van Heflin playing Marlowe. The show was a summer replacement for Bob Hope. The first episode adapted Chandler's short story "Red Wind". The NBC series ended 9 September 1947.  

In 1948, the series moved to CBS, where it was called The Adventures of Philip Marlowe, with Gerald Mohr playing Marlowe. This series also began with an adaptation of "Red Wind", using a script different from the NBC adaptation. By 1949, it had the largest audience in radio. The CBS version ran for 114 episodes. That series ran 26 September 1948 – 29 September 1950. 

From 7 July 1951 to 15 September 1951, the program was a summer replacement for Hopalong Cassidy.  Mohr played Marlowe in all but one of the CBS shows.  He was replaced by William Conrad in the 1950 episode, "The Anniversary Gift".

The episode "The Birds on the Wing" (aired 11-26-49) is especially notable for its beginning and ending, both uncharacteristically breaking the fourth wall. It opens with Marlowe saying he is currently reading "Chandler's latest The Little Sister" – thus a fictional character claims to be reading an actual book in which he is the main character. Even more surreal was the ending, in which Marlowe returns to his apartment to find Gracie Allen – who asks Marlowe to find her husband George Burns a radio show on which he can sing.

The program's composer was Lyn Murray, who worked in both film and radio at the time. The musical cue that plays over the opening narration in the series' first two episodes (where Marlowe recites the opening sentences of Chandler's original story "Red Wind") is a theme that would reappear prominently in Murray's 1954 score for Alfred Hitchcock's To Catch a Thief.

Despite the program's popularity, it had no sponsor for most of its time on the air. The lone exceptions were when Ford Motor Company and, subsequently, Wrigley's Gum sponsored it during part of 1950.

Gene D. Phillips, in the book Creatures of Darkness: Raymond Chandler, Detective Fiction, and Film Noir, reported Chandler's lack of involvement with the program: "Initially Chandler had considered asking for script approval for the Marlowe radio series, but ultimately he decided to have no connection with the scripting of the programs. He contented himself with the weekly royalties he received for the use of his character, while professing himself 'moderately pleased' with Gerald Mohr's portrayal of Marlowe."

Cast and crew

The first NBC episode had a script by Milton Geiger.  Chandler, in a letter to Erle Stanley Gardner, commented about his version, "It was thoroughly flat."  The CBS version had a better reception.  Norman Macdonnell was producer/director; Gene Levitt, Robert Mitchell, Mel Dinelli, and Kathleen Hite wrote the scripts; and Richard Aurandt was responsible for the music. Roy Rowan was announcer.  Performing alongside Mohr at various times were Jeff Corey, Howard McNear, Parley Baer, Lawrence Dobkin, Virginia Gregg, Gloria Blondell, and Lou Krugman.

Episodes

The following episodes are known to exist and are available for download on the web.

NBC Series
 47-06-12 (00) Who Shot Waldo
 Identical to episode #1.  There was no broadcast of the show on June 12. It is probable that this is only an incorrectly-dated version of episode 1.
 47-06-17 (01) The Red Wind (Van Heflin)
 47-07-01 (03) Daring Young Dame on The Flying Trapeze 
 47-07-08 (04) The King in Yellow
 47-08-05 (08) Trouble Is My Business

CBS Series
 48-09-26 (001) The Red Wind (Gerald Mohr)
 48-10-03 (002) The Persian Slippers
 48-10-10 (003) The Panama Hat
 48-10-17 (004) Where There's a Will
 48-10-24 (005) The Heart of Gold
 48-11-28 (010) The Hard Way Out
 48-12-26 (014) The Old Acquaintance
 49-01-08 (015) The Restless Day
 49-01-15 (016) The Black Halo
 49-01-22 (017) The Orange Dog
 49-01-29 (018) The Easy Mark
 49-02-05 (019) The Long Rope
 49-02-12 (020) The Lonesome Reunion
 49-03-05 (023) Friend from Detroit
 49-03-12 (024) Grim Hunters
 49-03-19 (025) The Dancing Hands
 49-03-26 (026) The Green Flame
 49-04-02 (027) The Last Laugh
 49-04-09 (028) Name to Remember
 49-04-16 (029) The Heat Wave
 49-04-23 (030) Cloak of Kamehameha
 49-04-30 (031) Lady in Mink
 49-05-07 (032) Feminine Touch
 49-05-14 (033) The Promise to Pay
 49-05-21 (034) Night Tide
 49-05-28 (035) The Ebony Link
 49-06-04 (036) The Unfair Lady
 49-06-11 (037) The Pigeons Blood
 49-06-18 (038) The Busy Body
 49-06-25 (039) The Key Man
 49-07-02 (040) Dude from Manhattan
 49-07-16 (042) The Headless Peacock
 49-07-30 (043) The Mexican Boat Ride
 49-08-06 (044) The August Lion
 49-08-13 (045) The Indian Giver
 49-08-20 (046) The Lady Killer
 49-08-27 (047) The Eager Witness
 49-09-03 (048) The Bum's Rush
 49-09-10 (049) Rustin Hickory
 49-09-17 (050) The Baton Sinister
 49-09-24 (051) The Fatted Calf
 49-10-01 (052) The Tale of the Mermaid
 49-10-08 (053) The Open Window
 49-10-15 (054) The Strangle Hold
 49-10-22 (055) The Smokeout
 49-10-29 (056) The Green Witch
 49-11-05 (057) The Fine Italian Hand
 49-11-12 (058) The Gorgeous Lyre
 49-11-26 (060) The Birds on the Wing
 49-12-03 (061) The Kid on the Corner
 49-12-10 (062) The Little Wishbone
 49-12-24 (064) Carol's Christmas
 49-12-31 (065) The House That Jacqueline Built
 50-01-07 (066) The Torch Carriers
 50-01-14 (067) The Covered Bridge
 50-01-21 (068) The Bid for Freedom
 50-01-28 (069) The Hairpin Turn
 50-02-07 (070) The Long Arm
 50-02-14 (071) The Grim Echo
 50-02-21 (072) The Ladies Night
 50-02-28 (073) The Big Step
 50-03-07 (074) The Monkey's Uncle
 50-03-14 (075) The Vital Statistic
 50-03-21 (076) The Deep Shadow
 50-03-28 (077) The Sword of Cebu
 50-04-04 (078) The Man on the Roof
 50-04-11 (079) The Anniversary Gift (William Conrad)
 50-04-18 (080) The Angry Eagle
 50-04-25 (081) The High Collared Cape
 50-05-02 (082) The Seahorse Jockey
 50-05-09 (083) The Hiding Place
 50-05-16 (084) Cloak of Kamehameha
 50-05-23 (085) The Fox's Tail
 50-05-30 (086) Bedside Manners
 50-06-06 (087) The Uneasy Head
 50-06-14 (088) Face to Forget
 50-06-21 (089) Gold Cobra
 50-06-28 (090) The Pelican's Roost
 50-07-05 (091) The Girl from Pitchfork Corners
 50-07-12 (092) The Iron Coffin
 50-07-19 (093) The Last Wish
 50-07-28 (094) The Glass Donkey
 50-08-04 (095) The Parrot's Bed
 50-08-11 (096) The Quiet Magpie
 50-08-18 (097) The Dark Tunnel
 50-08-25 (098) The Collector's Item
 50-09-01 (099) The Soft Spot
 50-09-08 (100) The Fifth Mask
 50-09-15 (101) The Final Payment
 50-09-22 (102) The White Carnation
 50-09-29 (103) The Big Book
 51-07-07 (104) A Seaside Sabbatical
 51-07-14 (105) The Dear, Dead Days
 51-07-21 (106) Life Can Be Murder
 51-07-28 (107) Good Neighbor Policy
 51-08-04 (108) Long Way Home
 51-08-18 (110) Young Man's Fancy
 51-08-25 (111) Heir for G String
 51-09-01 (112) Nether Neither Land
 51-09-08 (113) The Medium Was Rare
 51-09-15 (114) Sound and the Unsound

Other radio programs featuring Philip Marlowe:

 Lux Radio Theater 45-06-11 Murder My Sweet
 Hollywood Star Time 46-06-08 Murder My Sweet
 Lux Radio Theater 48-02-09 Lady in the Lake

References

External links

Logs
 The Adventures of Philip Marlowe log from Jerry Haendiges Vintage Radio Logs
 The Adventures of Philip Marlowe log from Old Time Radio Program Logs
 The Adventures of Philip Marlowe log from Old Time Radio Researchers Group
 The Adventures of Philip Marlowe log from radioGOLDINdex

Scripts
 Script for "The Panama Hat" episode of The Adventures of Philip Marlowe
 Script for "The Red Wind" episode of The Adventures of Philip Marlowe

Streaming

1940s American radio programs
1950s American radio programs
1947 radio programme debuts
1951 radio programme endings
NBC radio programs
CBS Radio programs
Radio programmes based on novels
Detective radio shows